The 1927 Ohio State Buckeyes football team represented Ohio State University in the 1927 Big Ten Conference football season. The Buckeyes compiled a 4–4 record but still won the point battle, 131–92. They lost to Michigan for the sixth straight season.

Schedule

Coaching staff
 John Wilce, head coach, 15th year

References

Ohio State
Ohio State Buckeyes football seasons
Ohio State Buckeyes football